is a manga series based on Fujiko F. Fujio's Doraemon. As the name suggests, Doraemon Long Stories features whole volumes of longer and continuous narratives about Doraemon, Nobita and friends on their adventures into various lands of science fiction and fantasy, unlike the regular Doraemon series which is merely compilations ("volumes") of various self-contained shorts.

The series was published in CoroCoro Comic magazine. The first 16 volumes were originally illustrated by Fujiko F. Fujio himself. After his death in 1996, the remaining volumes were written and illustrated by Shintaro Mugiwara and Yasunori Okada. The last eight volumes have the company's name on their covers instead of his name.

The series was adapted to a line of Doraemon films and various remakes, released in Japan cinemas between 1980 and 2004, and back into a separate manga series with screenshots taken from the films. The first 17 were released digitally on Amazon Kindle in color, translated in English for the North American market, on December 27, 2017.

History

North American Amazon Kindle Color Releases (English)

References

External links 
 ドラえもんチャンネル 
 

Shogakukan manga
CoroCoro Comic